Hello Kitty's Cube Frenzy (known as Hello Kitty's Cube de Cute in Japan) is a puzzle video game featuring Hello Kitty for the PlayStation and Game Boy Color.

Gameplay
The game involves guiding Hello Kitty into every item on a given level, using different types of bricks to manipulate her surroundings, thus allowing her to get every item. Often, the player must build steps for Hello Kitty out of Tetris-style falling bricks. Also, some of Hello Kitty's friends appear on levels, causing the bricks to move in undesirable ways. The Game Boy Color version suffers from sluggish controls, upping the difficulty level.

Reception

References

External links

1999 video games
Game Boy Color games
Cube Frenzy
PlayStation (console) games
Video games developed in Japan
Ubisoft games
Torus Games games
Single-player video games
Falling block puzzle games
NewKidCo games